Ligonier Ministries (also known as simply Ligonier) is an international Christian discipleship organization headquartered in the greater Orlando, Florida area. Ligonier was founded in 1971 by R. C. Sproul in the Ligonier Valley, Pennsylvania, outside of Pittsburgh. Ligonier is distinguished by its teaching of Reformed theology.

Since the passing of Sproul in 2017, the primary teachers at Ligonier are its teaching fellows: Sinclair Ferguson, W. Robert Godfrey, Steven Lawson, Stephen Nichols, Burk Parsons, and Derek Thomas. Ligonier publish the Reformation Study Bible, along with books written by Sproul and other evangelical theologians.

Ligonier offers undergraduate degrees through its sister organization Reformation Bible College. Ligonier also offers various teaching series, along with running annual national and regional conferences.

Primary activities
The main activities of Ligonier Ministries include the following:
 Producing Renewing Your Mind, a daily radio and Internet broadcast wherein Sproul and others teach systematic theology, Reformed theology, and the Bible
 Publishing a monthly magazine called Tabletalk
 Selling and distributing music, audiobook, video and print materials by Sproul, John Gerstner, and others
 RefNet (Reformation Network) internet radio
 Ligonier Connect online classes for lay people
 Reformation Bible College
 Holding conferences in Orlando and, in smaller form, elsewhere around the United States and internationally.
 Educational Church History Tours to the United Kingdom, Europe and Cruises to the Caribbean and Alaska that combines the cruise with Christian teaching

Controversies 
In September 2015, R. C. Sproul Jr., the son of Ligonier founder R. C. Sproul, was suspended from the organization until July 1, 2016 due to his visiting the Ashley Madison website. In December 2016, Sproul Jr. resigned from Ligonier Ministries and Reformation Bible College "for personal reasons." It was reported the following week that the reason for his resignation was that he had recently been arrested for drunk driving with a minor passenger in his vehicle.

Notes

References

External links 
 

1971 establishments in the United States
Calvinist organizations established in the 20th century
Christianity in Orlando, Florida
Evangelical parachurch organizations